Keysers Ridge is an unincorporated community in northern Garrett County, Maryland, United States. Named after William Keyser, vice president of the Baltimore & Ohio Railroad at the time, it lies to the west of Grantsville on Interstate 68 and is bounded to the northwest by the Savage River State Forest. It is primarily known for its key location on Interstate 68 and U.S. Route 40. In the past, Keysers Ridge was feared by travelers on the National Road due to its very harsh weather conditions as a result of its location at the top of a ridge to the west of Negro Mountain. The most snowfall ever recorded in a single winter in Maryland was during the winter of 2009–10, when 262.5 inches of snow fell at Keysers Ridge.

References

http://www.msa.md.gov/msa/mdmanual/01glance/html/weather.html

Unincorporated communities in Garrett County, Maryland
Unincorporated communities in Maryland